The 2012 Asian Shooting Championships were held in Doha, Qatar between January 11 and January 22, 2012. It acts as the Asian qualifying tournament for the 2012 Summer Olympics in London.

Medal summary

Men

Women

Medal table

References 
General
 ISSF Results Overview
 Results

Specific

External links 
 Official site
 Results Book

Asian Shooting Championships
Asian
Shooting
2012 in Qatari sport
21st century in Doha
Sports competitions in Doha
Shooting competitions in Qatar